The Upper Great Southern Football League is an Australian rules football league based in the state of Western Australia, incorporating teams from towns located within the Great Southern, Wheatbelt and Peel regions. The league was formed in 1959 from a merger of the town competitions in Wagin and Narrogin. There are currently 8 teams covering all tiers of the league.

The representative side from the league won the 2009 WA Country Football Championships, A-Section, defeating the Avon Football Association.

Current clubs

Previous clubs

Grand final results

Ladders

2011 ladder

2012 ladder

2013 ladder

2014 ladder

2015 ladder

2016 ladder

2017 ladder

2018 ladder

2019 ladder

2020 ladder

2021 ladder

2022 ladder

Premiers of the League

References

External links 
 

Australian rules football competitions in Western Australia